"Gymnasium" is a song by Australian singer-songwriter Stephen Cummings. "Gymnasium" was released in July 1984 as the fourth single from Cummings' debut studio album Senso. The song reached number 27 on the Australian singles chart.

At the 1984 Countdown Music Awards, the song earned Cummings a nomination for Best Male Performance in a Video.

Background 
After the breakup of The Sports in 1981, Cummings, Armiger and Pendlebury soon found themselves together again, working on Cummings' first solo album Senso with Armiger taking up the role of producer.

Track listing

Personnel 
 Arranged by (brass arrangements) – Greg Flood
 Joe Creighton - Bass, Additional vocals
 Mark Ferry - Bass
 Vince Jones - Cornet (solo)
 Martin Armiger - Drum programming (Drumulator), Guitar, Keyboards
 Peter Luscombe - Drums
 Andrew Pendlebury - Guitar
 Robert Goodge - Guitar
 Duncan Veal - Keyboards
 Jantra de Vilda - Keyboards
 Stephen Bigger - Keyboards
 Ricky Fataar -  Percussion
 Venetta Fields - Additional vocals
 Nick Smith - Additional vocals
 Linda Nutter - Additional vocals
 Nick Smith - Additional vocals
 Stephanie Sproul - Additional vocals

Charts

References 

1984 songs
1984 singles
Stephen Cummings songs
Songs written by Stephen Cummings
Songs written by Martin Armiger
Song recordings produced by Martin Armiger
Warner Music Group singles
Regular Records singles